Nesfatin-1 is a neuropeptide produced in the hypothalamus of mammals. It participates in the regulation of hunger and fat storage. Increased nesfatin-1 in the hypothalamus contributes to diminished hunger, a 'sense of fullness', and a potential loss of body fat and weight.

A study of metabolic effects of nesfatin-1 in rats have been done in which subjects administered nesfatin-1 ate less, used more stored fat and became more active. Nesfatin-1-induced inhibition of feeding may be mediated through the inhibition of orexigenic neurons. In addition, the protein stimulated insulin secretion from the pancreatic beta cells of both rats and mice.

Biochemistry

Nesfatin-1 is a polypeptide encoded in the N-terminal region of the protein precursor, Nucleobindin2 (NUCB2).
Recombinant human Nesfatin-1 is a 9.7 kDa protein containing 82 amino acid residues. Nesfatin-1 is expressed in the hypothalamus, in other areas of the brain, and in pancreatic islets, gastric endocrine cells and adipocytes.

Satiety
Nesfatin/NUCB2 is expressed in the appetite-control hypothalamic nuclei such as paraventricular nucleus (PVN), arcuate nucleus (ARC), supraoptic nucleus (SON) of hypothalamus, lateral hypothalamic area (LHA), and zona incerta in rats. Nesfatin-1 immunoreactivity was also found in the brainstem nuclei such as nucleus of the solitary tract (NTS) and Dorsal nucleus of vagus nerve.

Brain
Nesfatin-1 can cross the blood–brain barrier without saturation.

The receptors within the brain are in the hypothalamus and the solitary nucleus, where nesfatin-1 is believed to be produced via peroxisome proliferator-activated receptors (PPARs). It appears there is  a relationship between nesfatin-1 and cannabinoid receptors. Nesfatin-1-induced inhibition of feeding may be mediated through the inhibition of orexigenic NPY neurons.

Nesfatin/NUCB2 expression has been reported to be modulated by starvation and re-feeding in the Paraventricular nucleus (PVN) and supraoptic nucleus (SON) of the brain. Nesfatin-1 influences the excitability of a large proportion of different subpopulations of neurons located in the PVN. It is also reported that magnocellular oxytocin neurons are activated during feeding, and ICV infusion of oxytocin antagonist increases food intake, indicating a possible role of oxytocin in the regulation of feeding behavior. In addition, it is proposed that feeding-activated nesfatin-1 neurons in the PVN and SON could play an important role in the postprandial regulation of feeding behavior and energy homeostasis.

Nesfatin-1 immunopositive neurons are also located in the arcuate nucleus (ARC). Nesfatin-1 immunoreactive neurons in the ARC are activated by simultaneous injection of ghrelin and desacyl ghrelin, nesfatin-1 may be involved in the desacyl ghrelin-induced inhibition of the orexigenic effect of peripherally administered ghrelin in freely fed rat.

Nesfatin-1 was co-expressed with melanin concentrating hormone (MCH) in tuberal hypothalamic neurons. Nesfatin-1 co-expressed in MCH neurons may play a complex role not only in the regulation of food intake, but also in other essential integrative brain functions involving MCH signaling, ranging from autonomic regulation, stress, mood, cognition to sleep.

Metabolism

There is growing evidence that nesfatin-1 may play an important role in the regulation of food intake and glucose homeostasis. For instance, continuous infusion of nesfatin-1 into the third brain ventricle significantly decreased food intake and body weight gain in rats. In previous studies, it was demonstrated that plasma nesfatin-1 levels were elevated in patients with type 2 diabetes mellitus (T2DM) and associated with BMI, plasma insulin, and the homeostasis model assessment of insulin resistance.

It was found that central nesfatin-1 resulted in a marked suppression of hepatic PEPCK mRNA and protein levels in both standard diet (SD) and high fat diet (HFD) rats but failed to alter glucose 6-phosphatase (G-6-Pase) activity and protein expression. Central nesfatin-1 appeared to antagonize the effect of HFD on increasing PEPCK gene expression in vivo. In agreement with decreasing PEPCK gene expression, central nesfatin-1 also resulted in a reduced PEPCK enzyme activity, further confirming that it affected PEPCK rather than G-6-Pase.

The part of the glucose entering the liver is phosphorylated by glucokinase and then dephosphorylated by G-6-Pase. This futile cycle between glucokinase and G-6-Pase is named glucose cycling, and it accounts for the difference between the total flux through G-6-Pase and glucose production. G-6-Pase catalyzes the last step in both gluconeogenesis and glycogenolysis, and PEPCK is responsible only for gluconeogenesis. In this study, central nesfatin-1 led to a marked suppression of hepatic PEPCK protein and activity, but failed to alter hepatic G-6-Pase activity, suggesting that PEPCK may be more sensitive to short-term central nesfatin-1 exposure than G-6-Pase. In addition, suppression of HGP by central nesfatin-1 was dependent on an inhibition of the substrate flux through G-6-Pase and not on a decrease in the amount of G-6-Pase enzyme. Thus, in SD and HFD rats, central nesfatin-1 may have decreased glucose production mainly via decreasing gluconeogenesis and PEPCK activity.

Recently, it has been reported that ICV nesfatin-1 produced a dose-dependent delay of gastric emptying.

To further delineate the mechanism by which central nesfatin-1 modulates glucose homeostasis, we assessed the effects of central nesfatin-1 on the phosphorylation of several proteins in the INSR → IRS-1 → AMPK → Akt signaling cascade in the liver. We found that central nesfatin-1 significantly augmented InsR and IRS-1 tyrosine phosphorylation. These results demonstrated that central nesfatin-1 in both SD and HFD rats resulted in a stimulation of liver insulin signaling that could account for the increased insulin sensitivity and improving glucose metabolism.

AMPK is a key regulator of both lipid and glucose metabolism. It has been referred to as a metabolic master switch, because its activity is regulated by the energy status of the cell. In this study, we demonstrate that central nesfatin-1 resulted in increased phosphorylation of AMPK accompanied by a marked suppression of hepatic PEPCK activity, mRNA, and protein levels in both SD and HFD rats. Notably, central nesfatin-1 appears to prevent the obesity-driven decrease in phospho-AMPK levels in HFD-fed rats. Because hepatic AMPK controls glucose homeostasis mainly through the inhibition of gluconeogenic gene expression and glucose production, the suppressive effect of central nesfatin-1 on the HGP (Hepatic Glucose Production) can be attributed partly to its ability to suppress the expression of PEPCK mRNA and protein through AMPK activation. Furthermore, the activation of AMPK has been shown to enhance glucose uptake in skeletal muscle. Therefore, increased AMPK phosphorylation by central nesfatin-1 may also have been responsible for the improved glucose uptake in muscle.

Akt is a key effector of insulin-induced inhibition of HGP and stimulation of muscle glucose uptake. We therefore examined the effects of central nesfatin-1 on Akt phosphorylation in vivo. We found that central nesfatin-1 produced a pronounced increase in insulin-mediated phosphorylation of Akt in the liver of HFD-fed rats. This increase was paralleled by an increase in muscle glucose uptake and inhibition of HGP. This provided correlative evidence that Akt activation may be involved in nesfatin-1 signaling and its effects on glucose homeostasis and insulin sensitivity.

The mTOR pathway has emerged as a molecular mediator of insulin resistance, which can be activated by both insulin and nutrients. It is needed to fully activate AKT and consists of two discrete protein complexes, TORC1 and TORC2, only one of which, TORC1, binds rapamycin. In addition to mTOR, the TORC2 complex contains RICTOR, mLST8, and SIN1 and regulates insulin action and Akt phosphorylation. Thus, mTOR sits at a critical juncture between insulin and nutrient signaling, making it important both for insulin signaling downstream from Akt and for nutrient sensing. Until now, it has not been known whether nesfatin-1 affects activation of mTOR. To gain further insight into the mechanism underlying the insulin-sensitizing effects of ICV nesfatin-1, we assessed mTOR and TORC2 phosphorylation in liver samples of SD- and HFD-fed animals. Both mTOR and TORC2 phosphorylations were increased in livers from these rats, demonstrating activation of mTOR and TORC2 by central nesfatin-1 in vivo. As mTOR kinase activity is required for Akt phosphorylation, the observed increased Akt phosphorylation may have been caused by the concomitant activation of the mTOR/TORC2. Thus, it's postulated that the mTOR/TORC2 plays a role as a negative-feedback mechanism in the regulation of metabolism and insulin sensitivity mediated by central nesfatin-1.

See also
Diabetes
Ghrelin
Insulin
Leptin
Nucleobindin-2
Obestatin

References

External links
 

Molecular biology
Nutrition
Proteins
Proteomics